Vatalia or Vataliya Prajapati are an endogamous Hindu group and a sub-caste of Prajapati or Kumbhar caste found only in Gujarat.

Vatalia  are said to be off-springs of Brahmin father by a Kumbhar wife and as such are polluted Brahmins, who are now considered a part of 
Kumbhar community, as they took up job of potter. Their kuladevata are said to be Lord  Hanuman.

Vatalia along with other Prajapati sub-divisions like Sorathia, Gujjar, Varia, Parjiya are included in backward class communities of Gujarat.

Among their associations with other Kumbhar castes - they eat together with Varia, Gujjar and Koria Kumbhars but do not inter-marry. However, they would neither eat nor intermarry with Maru and Khambhati Kumbhars of Saurashtra.

Their population is mostly found in Saurashtra in cities of Ahmedabad, Surat, Bhavnagar, Vadodara and Amroli, Savarkundla, Rajula, Talaja,  Khambha, Katargaon regions. Outside Gujarat, there is notable population of community in Mumbai.

In Talaja, they are known as Tarahariya after the Tarahara village founded by Vatalia community, where the community members from other area still comes to pay homage to their Kulladevata temple of Hanuman.

The community was subject of medical study  with respect to G6PD deficiency and medical research in 2005, which concluded that Vataliya Prajapatis have high incidence of G6PD deficiency without severe chronic hemolytic anemia

The community publishes their own community periodical since 1958, which is circulated amongst the All India Vataliya Prjapati Community Association.

References

Social groups of Gujarat
Indian castes
Kumhar clans
Hindu communities